Jinjiazhuang Tunnel or Jinjiazhuang Spiral Tunnel, is the world's longest highway spiral tunnel.

The tunnel and the Yanchong Expressway will form the main route from Beijing to the Yanqing cluster of the Beijing 2022 Winter Olympics.

References 

Transport in Hebei
Buildings and structures in Hebei
Road tunnels in China
Tunnels completed in 2019